Techmash Qazvin Basketball Club is an Iranian professional basketball club based in Qazvin, Iran. They entered the Iranian Basketball Super League.

The team was owned and sponsored by Techmash Industrial Group. After qualification in Super League, the team transferred to another company, Foolad Haft Almas.

References

Basketball teams in Iran
Sport in Qazvin